Kids Channel (formerly Knowledge Channel  from 18 September 2007 to 15 September 2014) was a Mauritian free-to-air cartoon television channel owned and by Mauritius Broadcasting Corporation (MBC). The Knowledge Channel came into operation on 18 September 2007 playing cartoons, anime, teen sitcoms, game shows and educational children's TV series in both English and French. On 15 September 2014, the MBC renamed it to Kids Channel. At a certain time, the frequency went on live streaming of TV5Monde. The channel went off-air on 31 January 2015 and MBC reviewed their programming of all its channels. The closure also includes MBC News Channel. It was available on digital terrestrial television.

History 
In December 2006, the MBC announced its intention to extend its services. The national public broadcaster would offer 12 new channels (mainly Knowledge Channel, Sports 11 and Ciné 12) to its subscribers as from 2007. The management initially planned to launch the new service on 12 March 2007, the national day of Mauritius, but was not able to do so. On 18 September 2007, the channel started broadcasting under the name of Knowledge Channel. During peak hours, it was broadcasting its children's programming.  Recorded TV programs by TV5Monde and Voice of America were also aired. It had then ceased operations on 15 September 2014 to leave space for Kids Channel. During its prime time, TV shows produced by the Mauritius College of the Air (now the Open University of Mauritius) were aired. After the channel was closed on 31 January 2015, the MBC started broadcasting its animated series and other children's seroes on MBC 1 during the morning and afternoon again, like it did before 2007.

List of shows broadcast 

 2020
Argento soma
 A Kind of Magic (Magic in French)
 Adiboo Adventure: Inside the Human Body (Adibou: Aventure dans le Corps Humain in French)
 Adventurers: Masters of Time
 Angel's Friends
 Ants
 Ashley: The Growth of Monkey King
 Atomic Betty
 Atout 5
 Back at the Barnyard (La Ferme en Folie in French)
 Bernard
 Boule et Bill
 Brainy Bubbly Bug Buddies
 Bubble Guppies (Bubulle Guppies in French)
 Bugs' Adventures
 C'est pas sorcier
 Caillou
 Cajou
 Captain Biceps
 Casper's Scare School (Casper, l'école de la peur in French)
 CatDog (Michat-Michien in French)
 [[:fr:Cédric (comics)#Cartoon series|Cédric]]
 Chaplin & Co
 Chocotte Minute
 Christophe Colomb
 Clic & Kat
 Code Lyoko
 Conch Bay
 Cooking? Child’s Play! (La cuisine est un jeu d’enfants in French)
 Crafty Kids Club (Brico Club in French)
 Curious George (George le petit curieux in French)
 Des chiffres et des lettres
 Detective Bogey
 Dinofroz
 Dinosaur Train
 Dofus, aux trésors de Kerubim
 Dora the Explorer (Dora l’exploratrice in French)
 Dragon Hunters (Chasseurs de Dragons in French)
 Edouard et Martin
 Fantastic Four: World's Greatest Heroes (Les Quatre Fantastiques in French)
 Farhat: The Prince of The Desert
 Fils de Wouf
 Fish 'n' Chips
 Flipper and Lopaka
 FloopaLoo, Where Are You? (Flapacha, où es-tu? in French)
 Foot 2 Rue
 Football Stories
 Franky Snow
 Freefonix
 Galactik Football
 Geronimo Stilton
 Gloria's House (Gloria et les autres in French)
 Gnark Bugged
 Go, Diego, Go!
 Gofrette
 Gormiti: Nature Unleashed
 Grabouillon
 Grachi
 Grenadine and Peppermint (Grenadine et Mentalo in French)
 How I Met Your Mother
 Hutos: The Flying House
 Once Upon a Time... Planet Earth (Il était une fois... notre Terre in French)
 Iron Man: Armored Adventures
 Johnny Test
 Jurassic Cubs (Petits Dinos in French)
 Kaeloo
 Kambu
 Kangoo
 Kid Paddle
 Kirikou découvre les animaux d'Afrique
 Kobushi
 Kung Foot
 Kung Fu Masters of Zodiac: 12 Zodiac Way
 Kung Fu Panda: Legends of Awesomeness (Kung Fu Panda: L'Incroyable Légende in French)
 La Famille Pirate
 La Fée Coquillette
 Lazy Lucy (Façon Lucie in French)
 Le Monde de Pahé
 Le Petit Nicolas
 Léon, (t)erreur de la savane
 Léonard
 Les Blagues de Toto
 Les Dalton
 Les Hydronautes
 Les Minijusticiers
 Les P'tites Poules
 Les P'tits Diables
 Li'l Elvis and the Truckstoppers (Li’l Elvis et les Truckstoppers in French)
 Little Einsteins (Les Petits Einsteins in French)
 Lou!
 Louie (Didou in French)
 Lulu Zipadoo (Lulu Vroumette in French)
 Lulu's Islands (Les Mistigris in French)
 Magic Planet
 Manon
 Marcelino
 Marsupilami
 Martin Morning (Martin Matin in French)
 Martin Mystery (Martin Mystère in French)
 Maya the Bee (Maya l'abeille in French)
 Mermaid Melody Pichi Pichi Pitch
 Mickey Mouse Clubhouse (La Maison de Mickey in French)
 Mikido
 Mila raconte mille et une histoires
 Mini-Loup
 Minuscule
 Moko, enfant du monde
 Mon ami Grompf
 Monk Little Dog (Monk: la Cata sur Pattes in French)
 Mouk
 Mr. Baby (Monsieur Bébé in French)
 My Almost Famous Family
 My Animal Family
 Nelly & César
 Nini Patalo
 Noddy (Oui-Oui in French)
 Nouky and Friends (Paco, Nouky et Lola in French)
 Oscar's Oasis
 OVNI
 Ozie Boo!
 Panshel
 Pat & Stan
 PAW Patrol (La Pat’ Patrouille in French)
 Percy's Tiger Tales (Percy et ses amis in French)
 Phantom 2040
 Pitt & Kantrop
 Planet Sheen
 Playtime Buddies
 Pokémon
 Prove It!
 Puppy in My Pocket: Adventures in Pocketville
 Rahan
 Raymond
 Sagwa, the Chinese Siamese Cat (Sagwa, le Chat Siamois Chinois in French)
 Sally Bollywood: Super Detective
 SamSam
 Samson et Néon
 Sandokan: The Tiger of Malaysia
 Santa's Apprentice (L'apprenti Père Noël in French)
 Shuriken School
 Sid the Science Kid
 Simba, the King Lion
 Slayers
 Skunk Fu!
 Sophie's Misfortunes (Les Malheurs de Sophie in French)
 SOS Croco
 Speed Racer: The Next Generation
 Spirou et Fantasio
 Splash and Bubbles
 SpongeBob SquarePants (Bob l'éponge in French)
 T'choupi à l'école
 T'choupi et Doudou
 T'choupi et ses amis
 Tales of Tatonka  (Les Légendes de Tatonka in French)
 Talis, le chevalier du temps Team Galaxy Teenage Mutant Ninja Turtles (Les Tortues Ninja in French)
 Teletubbies Telmo and Tula Tendres Agneaux The Amazing Spiez! (SpieZ! Nouvelle Génération in French)
 The Beet Party The Black Corsair The Gloops The Gnoufs (Les Gnoufs in French)
 The Great Book of Nature The Little Bear (Pluche, Riquet, Pat in French)
 The Magic Roundabout (Le Manège Enchanté in French)
 The Mysterious Cities of Gold (Les Mystérieuses Cités d'or in French)
 The New Woody Woodpecker Show The Nimbols The Old Testament The Penguins of Madagascar (Les Pingouins de Madagascar in French)
 The Simpsons The Small Giant (La Petite Géante in French)
 Thomas & Friends Titeuf Tony et Alberto Totally Spies! Triple Z Trolls of Troy (Trolls de Troy in French)
 Trotro Trust Me, I’m a Genie (Diego et Ziggy in French)
 T.U.F.F. Puppy Turtle Hero Van Dogh Violetta Virus Attack Wakfu Wallace and Gromit Watch My Chops (Corneil et Bernie in French)
 Winx Club Yakari Yu-Gi-Oh! Zig & Sharko Zoomix Zou''

See also
 MBC 1
 MBC 2
Ciné 12
 Media of Mauritius
List of television channels in Mauritius

References

Television channels in Mauritius